Giacomo Filippi (born 27 October 1975) is an Italian football coach and former defender. He was most recently the head coach of Viterbese in the Italian Serie C.

Playing career
Filippi started his career with hometown amateur club Partinico Audace. In 1996 he moved into professionalism with then-Serie C2 club Ternana. In 1999 he was signed by Serie B club Treviso, playing three seasons as a regular for the Venetians (two of which in the Italian second division).

He successively spent a number of seasons with different teams at Serie C1 and Serie C2 level until joining Trapani of Serie D in 2009; with Trapani, he won three promotions, all the way up to Serie B, as team captain under the management of Roberto Boscaglia. He retired in 2013, after winning promotion to Serie B.

Coaching career
After retiring as a player, he accepted to stay at Trapani as a youth coach for the Allievi team. In 2015, he was called by his former manager Roberto Boscaglia as his assistant at Brescia.

Successively, Filippi followed Boscaglia on all of his later coaching jobs at Novara, Brescia for a second time, Virtus Entella and, in 2020, Palermo.

On 27 February 2021, Filippi was promoted head coach of Palermo after the Rosanero board decided to sack Boscaglia from his role. Under his tenure in the second half of the 2020–21 Serie C season, results significantly improved and Palermo manage to qualify to the promotion playoffs, from where they were eliminated in the third round by third-placed Avellino. These positive results led Palermo to confirm Filippi in charge of the first team also for the following 2021–22 Serie C season. He was dismissed from his position on 24 December 2021, following a 0–2 loss against Latina that left Palermo in fifth place, eleven points behind league leaders Bari.

On 1 July 2022, Filippi was announced as the new head coach of Serie C club Viterbese, signing a one-year deal with the club. He was dismissed on 14 November 2022 following a negative start of the season.

Managerial statistics

References

1975 births
Living people
People from Partinico
Italian footballers
Italian football managers
Palermo F.C. managers
Association football defenders
Footballers from Sicily
Serie C managers
Sportspeople from the Province of Palermo